A Sacred Concert is a concert of sacred music. The expression may refer to:
 Sacred concerto, after German Geistliches Konzert, 17th-century precursor to the sacred cantata genre
 Oratorio, or similar sacred composition
 Sacred Concert (Ellington), realised by Duke Ellington in 1965, 1968 and 1973
 "A Sacred Concert", short story by Mary Tappan Wright